Galya Anetova Shatova (Bulgarian: Галя Шатова; born ) is a Bulgarian weightlifter competing in the 63 kg category until 2018 and 64 kg starting in 2018 after the International Weightlifting Federation reorganized the categories.

Career
In 2018, she competed in the 63 kg division at the European Weightlifting Championships. and, in that same year, she won the bronze medal at the Summer Youth Olympics in the 63 kg event.

Major results

References

2001 births
Living people
Bulgarian female weightlifters
Weightlifters at the 2018 Summer Youth Olympics
21st-century Bulgarian women